"Streetcorner Symphony" is the fifth and final single from American singer-songwriter Rob Thomas's 2005 debut solo album, ...Something to Be. It was released on October 16, 2006. The song features John Mayer on lead guitar and backing vocals (though John is not credited as an official artist).

This song has been featured on advertisements for ABC's Thursday-night lineup, including Ugly Betty, Grey's Anatomy, and Six Degrees. Rob and his band sang it on Good Morning America.

Music video
The video features concert footage of Rob performing the song.

Charts

Weekly charts

Year-end charts

Sales and certifications

References

 

Rob Thomas (musician) songs
2005 songs
2006 singles
Atlantic Records singles
Song recordings produced by Matt Serletic
Songs written by Matt Serletic
Songs written by Rob Thomas (musician)